Héctor Figueroa Cabrera (born 30 October 1988) is a Spanish professional footballer who plays for UD Gran Tarajal as a forward.

Football career
Born in Las Palmas, Canary Islands, Figueroa finished his graduation with local UD Villa de Santa Brígida's youth setup, and made his senior debuts with the reserves in the 2008–09 season, in Tercera División. In the same campaign he also began appearing with the main squad, in Segunda División B.

In the 2012 summer Figueroa joined Estrella CF, also in the fourth level. In January of the following year he signed with UD Las Palmas, being initially assigned to the reserves, being promoted to the third level at the end of 2012–13 season and also being the club second topscorer (only two goals behind Cristian Herrera).

On 29 January 2014, after being the B-team's topscorer in Segunda División B, Figueroa was promoted to the main squad in Segunda División, signing a -year deal. He made his debut as a professional three days later, starting in a 0–1 away loss against SD Eibar.

Figueroa scored his first professional goal on 15 March, netting the last in a 5–0 home routing over CE Sabadell FC. On 4 August 2015 he signed a new contract until 2018, being immediately loaned to SD Huesca also in the second tier.

On 19 July 2016, Figueroa moved to SD Ponferradina again in a temporary deal. The following 7 July, after returning from loan, he cut ties with Las Palmas and went on to resume his career in the third division, representing CD Toledo and Burgos CF.

Personal life
Figueroa's older brothers, Momo and David, also played for Las Palmas.

References

External links

1988 births
Living people
Footballers from Las Palmas
Spanish footballers
Spanish expatriate footballers
Association football forwards
Segunda División players
Segunda División B players
Tercera División players
UD Las Palmas Atlético players
UD Las Palmas players
SD Huesca footballers
SD Ponferradina players
CD Toledo players
Burgos CF footballers
Lincoln Red Imps F.C. players
Spanish expatriate sportspeople in Gibraltar
Expatriate footballers in Gibraltar